Pyapun is an Afro-Asiatic language spoken in Plateau State, Nigeria. It is spoken in about 10 villages east of the Panyam-Shendam road.

Further reading
A Sociolinguistic Profile of the Piapung (Pyapun) [pcw] Language of Plateau State, Nigeria

Notes 

Languages of Nigeria
West Chadic languages